The Continental Baseball League, based in Addison, Texas, was an independent minor league professional baseball league that operated for four seasons, from 2007 to 2010. The league conceived as a professional, independent baseball organization operating in the U.S. states of New Mexico, Louisiana and Texas in cities not served by Major League Baseball or Minor League Baseball teams nor affiliated with either.  The league was founded by Ron Baron and former major leaguer Jay Johnstone.

After a shortened 2010 season, the Continental Baseball League ceased operations after the league championship was played on July 31. Some of the teams which played in the 2010 season moved to the Pecos League in 2011.

2010 Season Overview

Standings
Final regular season standings for 2010:

 - CBL Champions

2009 Season Overview

Standings
Final regular season standings for 2009:

 - CBL Champions

2008 Season Overview

Standings
 Final regular-season standings for 2008

 - CBL Champions

2007 Season Review

Standings
Final regular-season standings for 2007

 - CBL Champions

Expansion

References

External links and references

 
Defunct independent baseball leagues in the United States
Baseball leagues in Louisiana
Baseball leagues in New Mexico
Baseball leagues in Texas
2007 establishments in the United States
Sports leagues established in 2007
Sports leagues disestablished in 2010
2010 disestablishments in the United States